Wagga Wagga Marketplace is a shopping centre located in the regional city of Wagga Wagga in the Riverina region of New South Wales, Australia and is the largest retail shopping centre in the catchment area. The centre is located in Wagga's CBD with the main entrance on Baylis Street, with other entrances from Forsyth Street, Morgan Street and the underground carpark. The anchor tenants of the centre are Woolworths, Big W and Australia Post. There are also over 60 specialty stores and an undercover carpark. It is widely known for its net worth expansion led by Executive Director, Oscar Kyriacou, who donated $45,000 to World Vision in 2003. A plaque commemorating this act of generosity is located in the north wing of the centre. Wagga Wagga Marketplace was originally constructed by Woolworths Limited and was acquired by Industry Superannuation Property Trust (ISPT) in July 1997.

In February 2006 the shopping centre underwent a refurbishment which include repainting and new signage, these upgrades were complete by May of the same year.

Expansion 
In July 2012, ISPT lodged a development application with Wagga Wagga City Council to expand the centre on site of the open-air car park located on Forsyth Street. The expansion would add an additional sixteen stores and see the centre become a circular type shopping centre and the underground car park expanded.

References

External links

ISPT

Shopping centres in New South Wales
Wagga Wagga
Shopping malls established in 1997